is the third major single by the Japanese girl idol group Shiritsu Ebisu Chugaku, released in Japan on January 16, 2013 by Defstar Records.

Release details 
The single was released in three versions: Subculture Edition (Regular Edition), Limited Edition A, and Limited Edition B.

Chart performance 
The single debuted at the 3rd position in the Oricon Daily Singles Chart.

Members 
Shiritsu Ebisu Chugaku: Mizuki, Rika Mayama, Natsu Anno, Ayaka Yasumoto, Aika Hirota, Mirei Hoshina, Hirono Suzuki, Rina Matsuno, Hinata Kashiwagi

Track listing

Limited Ē Edition

Limited Bī Edition

Subculture Edition (Regular Edition)

Charts

References

External links 
 3rd single "Ume" out January 16, 2013 - Shiritsu Ebisu Chugaku official site
 Reviews
 Review: Shiritsu Ebisu Chugaku "Ume"  - Rolling Stone Japan
 Music videos
 
 

Shiritsu Ebisu Chugaku songs
2013 singles
Japanese-language songs
Defstar Records singles
Songs written by Kenichi Maeyamada
2013 songs